This is a statistical synopsis of event of Curling at the 2010 Winter Olympics.

6 of the 80 curlers at the 1998 Nagano Olympics are competing in Vancouver (plus a seventh who serves as a coach).

12 of the 100 curlers at the 2002 Salt Lake City Olympics are in Vancouver.

22 of the 100 curlers at the 2006 Turin Olympics are back in Vancouver.

Percentages
In curling, each player is graded on their shots on a scale of zero to four. Their cumulative point total is then marked as a percentage out of the total points possible. This score is just for statistical purposes, and has nothing to do with the outcome of the game.

Men's tournament
Percentages by draw.

Leads

1 Normally throws second

Seconds

1Normally throws third rocks
2Includes percentages from playing lead
3Includes percentages from playing third

Thirds

1 Normally throws last rocks 
2 Normally throws second rocks 
3 Includes games played as fourth 
4 Includes games played as second

Skips

1 Normally throws third  
2 Includes games played as third

Team totals

Women's tournament
Percentages by draw.

Leads

Seconds

1 Normally throws third
2Includes games played third

Thirds

1 Normally throws last rocks
2 Normally throws second rocks  
3 Includes games played as fourth
4 Includes games played as second

Fourth

1 Normally throws third rocks
2 Includes games played as third

Team totals

Team statistics

Men's tournament

Women's tournament

Key

PF/G = Average number of points per game
PA/G = Average number of points against per game
EF/G = Average number of ends won per game
EA/G = Average number of ends lost per game
PF/E = Average number of points per end
PA/E = Average number of post against per end
BE/G = Average number of blank ends per game
HE% = Percentage of ends with last rock advantage where a team scores at least two points
SE% = Percentage of ends where a team without last rock advantage scores at least one point
FE% = Percentage of ends where a team without last rock advantage forces their opposition to just one point

Statistics